Barium perchlorate is a powerful oxidizing agent, with the formula Ba(ClO4)2.  It is used in the pyrotechnic industry.

Barium perchlorate decomposes at 505 °C.

Structure of barium perchlorate trihydrate 
Gallucci and Gerkin (1988) analyzed the structure of the hydrate isomer barium perchlorate trihydrate (Ba(ClO4)2•3H2O) by X-ray crystallography. The barium ions are coordinated by six water oxygen atoms at 2.919Å and six perchlorate oxygens at 3.026Å in a distorted icosahedral arrangement. The perchlorate fails by a narrow margin to have regular tetrahedral geometry, and has an average Cl-O bond length of 1.433Å. The space-group assignment of the structure was resolved, with the centrosymmetric assignment of P63/m confirmed. Each axial perchlorate oxygen is hydrogen bonded to three water molecules and each trigonal oxygen is hydrogen bonded to two water molecules. This interaction is the reason that the perchlorate fails to be tetrahedral.

Preparation
Barium perchlorate can be prepared using many different reagents and methods. One method involves evaporating a solution containing barium chloride and an excess of perchloric acid. The dihydrate form is produced by recrystallizing and drying to a constant weight. Additional drying over sulfuric acid yields the monohydrate. The anhydrous form is obtained by heating to 140 °C in vacuum. Dehydration of barium perchlorate that does not occur in vacuum will also result in hydrolysis of the perchlorate. Other reactions that produce barium perchlorate are as follows: perchloric acid and barium hydroxide or carbonate; potassium perchlorate and hydrofluosilicic acid followed with barium carbonate; boiling solution of potassium chlorate and zinc fluosilicate. For large-scale manufacturing purposes, barium perchlorate is synthesized by evaporating a solution of sodium perchlorate and barium chloride. Another method of preparation involves the digestion of a saturated solution of ammonium perchlorate with hydrated barium hydroxide in 5-10% excess of the theoretical amount.

Applications 
Due to its characteristic as a powerful oxidation agent, one of barium perchlorate’s primary uses is in the manufacture and preparation of explosive emulsions and other explosive compounds. Using an emulsifier makes the process of transporting and handling of the explosive material while still retaining its destructive properties at the end point of use. Perchlorate explosives were mainly used in industrial applications, such as mining during the 1920s.

Barium perchlorate is also able to complex with the quinolone antibacterial agents ciprofloxacin and norfloxacin. FTIR data suggests that CIP and NOR act as bidentate ligands, using the ring carbonyl oxygen and an oxygen of the carboxylic group. This coordination is significant because it increases the solubility of the antibiotics in water and other polar solvents, increasing their uptake efficiency.

Because of its high solubility in water, anhydrous barium perchlorate can be used as a dehydrating reagent for other compounds. Due to its high solubility, ease of preparation, low cost, stability at high temperatures, and relatively ease of regeneration, barium perchlorate is a favored compound for dehydrating compounds. The need for dehydrating compounds has increased with the use of chemical reactions employing gases under pressure, as the water must be removed from the air prior to the reaction taking place.

Barium perchlorate is also used for the determination of small concentrations (down to 10 ppm, with an accuracy of +/- 1 ppm) of sulfate. In order for the titration to be successful, a high concentration of a nonaqueous solvent, such as ethyl alcohol, 2-propanol, or methanol, must be present. Thorin is typically used as the indicator.

References

Perchlorates
Barium compounds
Oxidizing agents